Chivatá is a town and municipality in the Central Boyacá Province, part of the Colombian department of Boyacá. It borders Oicatá, Toca and Tuta in the north, Toca and Siachoque in the east, Siachoque and Soracá in the south and Tunja in the west.

Etymology 
The name Chivatá is derived from the Chibcha language of the Muisca who inhabited the central highlands of Colombia before the Spanish conquest in the 1530s. It means "Our outside farmfields".

History 
Chivatá was ruled by a cacique named Chipatá, loyal to the zaque of nearby Hunza before the arrival of the Spanish conquistadores. Modern Chivatá was founded on March 5, 1556.

Gallery

References 

Municipalities of Boyacá Department
Populated places established in 1556
1556 establishments in the Spanish Empire
Muysccubun